Acacia amentifera is a tree belonging to the genus Acacia and the subgenus Juliflorae. It is endemic to parts of northern Australia.

The shrub has angled branchlets with resinous ribs.

The species is known in the upper catchment of the Victoria River in the Northern Territory.

See also
List of Acacia species

References

External links
 Acacia amentifera: occurrence data from the Australasian Virtual Herbarium

amentifera
Flora of the Northern Territory
Plants described in 1859
Taxa named by Ferdinand von Mueller